Arcelia is a city and seat of the municipality of Arcelia, in the state of Guerrero, south-western Mexico.

References

Populated places in Guerrero